Bubi is a district in Matabeleland North in Zimbabwe. Its 2012 census population was 61,883.

Notes and references

 
Districts of Matabeleland North Province